Walter Harris Callow (1896–1958) was a Canadian veteran who invented the accessibility bus for veterans returning from WW2 and others in wheelchairs (1947). He designed and managed the Walter Callow Wheelchair Bus, while he himself was blind, quadriplegic and, eventually had both legs amputated. Callow planned trips for disabled veterans, tours of the countryside, picnics, sporting events, art classes and other activities. He was born in Parrsboro, Nova Scotia and became a resident of the Camp Hill Military Hospital for twenty years.

Biography 

As a member of the Royal Flying Corps in Camp Mohawk, Ontario, Callow crashed in a test flight in 1918.  He received a serious back injury and a heart condition.  He continued on in a lumber business in Advocate, Nova Scotia.  He eventually became bed-ridden in 1931 because of his injuries, the same year his mother and wife died and left him with a young child.  He continued business by selling real-estate.

In 1937 Callow became a full-time resident of the Camp Hill Hospital and two years later he was blind and quadriplegic.  While at the Hospital he established a board of directors and hired two secretaries.  He established the Callow Cigarette Fund to send cigarettes to soldiers serving over-seas during World War II.

After the war, he turned his cigarette fund into a wheelchair coach service for disabled veterans (1947).  He started by having two custom-made buses built in Pubnico, Nova Scotia. He eventually garnered the support of General Motors and Ford to build the wheelchair coaches.  He named the company the "Callow Veterans' and Invalids' Welfare League" and established an office in Halifax.  He worked tirelessly to make facilities accessible and to make visible the needs of those with physical disabilities.

His funeral was conducted in Halifax with full military honours. The only time that Callow had the opportunity to ride on his bus is when his body was returned to Advocate to be buried.

Legacy 

There was an unveiling of the Walter Callow Memorial Plaque at the Advocate cemetery on 10 August 2001.

The Walter Callow Wheelchair Bus continues today.

See also 
Military history of Nova Scotia
 List of people with quadriplegia
 Wheelchair accessible van

References 
Endnotes

Texts
The Achievement of Walter Callow. Montreal Gazette. 26 February 1953
The Story of the Callow Wheelchair Coach
 Wheelchair bus service turns 65, founder lauded. Chronicle Herald
 Walter Callow. A Challenge: Will You Help? Walter Callow's Veterans and Invalids Club. Halifax : Wm. Macnab & Son, 1947
Lethbridge Herald. Caring and Courage. 25 November 1752, p. 9
Montreal Gazette 22 March 1955

People from Cumberland County, Nova Scotia
Canadian blind people
Canadian humanitarians
People with tetraplegia
Canadian amputees
20th-century Canadian inventors
Military history of Nova Scotia
1896 births
1958 deaths
Canadian disability rights activists
Sustainable transport pioneers